Notable authors who have written dramatic works in the Russian language include:

Alphabetical list

A

B

C

D

E

F

G

I

K

L

M

N

O

P

R

S

T

U

V

Z

See also
 List of Russian-language writers
List of Russian-language novelists
List of Russian-language poets
 List of Russian artists
 List of Russian architects
 List of Russian inventors
 List of Russian explorers
 Russian culture
Russian literature
Russian language
Russian culture

Russian playwrights
 
 
 
 
Playwrights
Russian
Playwrights